Hippotion rebeli is a moth of the family Sphingidae. It is known from dry areas in northern Uganda, Kenya, Tanzania, Sudan, Ethiopia, Somalia and Arabia.

The length of the forewings is 25–28 mm. It is very similar to Hippotion roseipennis and equally variable, but larger and generally more reddish on both sides and more heavily marked.

References

 Pinhey, E. (1962): Hawk Moths of Central and Southern Africa. Longmans Southern Africa, Cape Town.

Hippotion
Moths described in 1903
Moths of Africa